Adi Nugroho (born 3 September 1992) is an Indonesian professional footballer who plays as a winger.

Club career

Mitra Kukar
Nugroho was signed by Mitra Kukar to play in Liga 2 in the 2019 season.

International career
In 2014, Adi Nogroho represented the Indonesia U-19, in the 2014 AFF U-19 Youth Championship.

References

External links
 Adi Nugroho at Liga Indonesia
 Adi Nugroho at Soccerway

1992 births
Indonesian footballers
Living people
People from Samarinda
Association football forwards
Semen Padang F.C. players
Sportspeople from East Kalimantan